The Helen Hayes Awards are given for acting in resident theatre productions in the Washington, DC metropolitan area. The awards are generally divided between male and female performers, between lead and supporting performers, and since the early 1990s between dramatic plays and musicals.

Lead Acting

Outstanding Lead Actor in a Resident Production
 1985 Francois de la Giroday - Man and Superman - Arena Stage
 Kevin Donovan - Cloud 9 - Arena Stage
 Richard Bauer - Enter a Free Man - Olney Theatre
 Stanley Anderson - Lydie Breeze - New Playwrights' Theatre
 Tom Toner - The Gin Game - Olney Theatre
 1986 Thomas Schall - Fool for Love - Round House Theatre
 Grover Gardner - Looking Glass - Woolly Mammoth Theatre Company
 Grover Gardner - Metamorphosis - Woolly Mammoth Theatre Company
 Mark Jaster - The Man Who Killed the Buddha - Round House Theatre
 Richard Bauer - Tartuffe - Arena Stage
 Steven Dawn - Extremities - Source Theatre Company
 1987 Howie Seago - Ajax - American National Theatre
 Casey Biggs - The Taming of the Shrew - Arena Stage
 Doug Brown - Ma Rainey's Black Bottom - The Studio Theatre
 Howard Shalwitz - Christmas on Mars - Woolly Mammoth Theatre Company
 John Wylie - The Miser - The Shakespeare Theatre
 Michael Willis - New York Mets - Woolly Mammoth Theatre Company
 Simon Brooking - Still Life - The Studio Theatre
 1988 Michael Judge - How I Got That Story - Source Theatre Company
 Bill Grimmett - The Blood Knot - American Showcase Theatre
 Casey Biggs - All the King's Men - Arena Stage
 Grover Gardner - Harvey - Woolly Mammoth Theatre Company
 Michael Chaban - As Is - The Studio Theatre
 Nat Benchley - The Blood Knot - American Showcase Theatre
 T J Edwards - As Is - The Studio Theatre
 1989 Michael Willis - The Boys Next Door - Round House Theatre
 Brian Bedford - The Merchant of Venice - The Shakespeare Theatre
 Brian Hemmingsen - Endgame - Scena Theatre
 Floyd King - The Mystery of Irma Vep (A Penny Dreadful) - The Studio Theatre
 Stanley Anderson - Enrico IV - Arena Stage
 Tom Hewitt - Ring Round the Moon - Arena Stage
 1990 David Marks - Briar Patch - Arena Stage
 Harry R. Tate - Bluesman - Source Theatre Company
 Jerry Whiddon - Heathen Valley - Round House Theatre
 Richard Bauer - The Man Who Came to Dinner - Arena Stage
 Richard Bauer - The Return of Herbert Bracewell - Olney Theatre
 Stanley Anderson - A Walk in the Woods - Arena Stage
 1991 Luis Ramos - Stand-Up Tragedy - Arena Stage
 Avery Brooks - Othello - The Shakespeare Theatre
 Denis Arndt - Juno and the Paycock - Arena Stage
 Lawrence Redmond - Frankie and Johnny in the Clair de Lune - The Studio Theatre
 Philip Goodwin - The Puppetmaster of Łódź - The Studio Theatre
 Robert Prosky - Our Town - Arena Stage
 Stacy Keach - Richard III - The Shakespeare Theatre
 1992 Floyd King - A Tale of Two Cities - The Studio Theatre
Daniel R. Escobar - Psycho Beach Party - Source Theatre Company
Hugo Medrano - El Protagonista - GALA Hispanic Theatre
 James Whitmore - Will Rogers' USA - Ford's Theatre
 Mphela Makgoba - The Island - American Showcase Theatre
 Richard Bauer - I'm Not Rappaport - Olney Theatre
 Richard Pilcher - A Poster of the Cosmos - Potomac Theatre Project
 T J Edwards - Hamlet - Washington Shakespeare Company

Outstanding Lead Actor in a Non-Resident Production 
 1987 Delroy Lindo - A Raisin in the Sun

Outstanding Lead Actor in a Resident Play
 1993 Richard Bauer - School for Wives - Arena Stage
 Floyd King - Troilus and Cressida - The Shakespeare Theatre
 Henry Strozier - The Father - Arena Stage
 Jerry Whiddon - Joe Egg - Round House Theatre
 Philip Goodwin - The Lisbon Traviata - The Studio Theatre
 Tom Hulce - Hamlet - The Shakespeare Theatre
 1994 Hugo Medrano - El Beso de la Mujer Ara1a - GALA Hispanic Theatre
 Doug Brown - Mooi Street Moves - MetroStage
 Hugh Nees - La B te - Source Theatre Company
 Ken Ruta - Shadowlands - Olney Theatre
 Richard Thomas - Richard II - The Shakespeare Theatre
 Wallace Acton - Unidentified Human Remains and the True Nature of Love - Signature Theatre
 1995 Robert Prosky - The Price - Arena Stage
 Derek Smith - Henry IV - The Shakespeare Theatre
 Jerry Whiddon - Who's Afraid of Virginia Woolf? - Round House Theatre
 Jon Tindle - The Swan - Round House Theatre
 Ramon Melindez Moses - Otabenga - Signature Theatre
 Rob Leo Roy - The Food Chain - Woolly Mammoth Theatre Company
 Wallace Acton - The Night Larry Kramer Kissed Me - Freedom Stage
 1996 Wallace Acton - The Pitchfork Disney - Woolly Mammoth Theatre Company
 Conrad Feininger - A Tale of the Wolf - The Washington Stage Guild
 Harry Hamlin - Henry V - The Shakespeare Theatre
 Ian Price - Private Lives - Folger Shakespeare Library
 Ian Price - Private Lives - InterAct Theatre Company
 Rick Hammerly - Me and Jezebel - MetroStage
 Stacy Keach - Macbeth - The Shakespeare Theatre
 Wendell Wright - I Am a Man - Arena Stage
 1997 David Fendig - Travesties - Washington Shakespeare Company
 Edward Gero - Broken Glass - The Rep Stage Company
 Floyd King - Quills - Wooly Mammoth Theatre Company
 Hoard Shalwitz - The Gigli Concert - Wool Mammoth Theatre Company
 Henry Strozier - Dance of Death - Arena Stage
 Jonathan Tindle - Talking Heads - The Studio Theatre
 Jerry Whidden - An Almost Holy Picture - Round House Theatre
 1998 Edward Gero - Skylight - The Studio Theatre
 Bill Largess - An Ideal Husband - The Washington Stage Guild
 Jason Patrick Bowcutt - Never the Sinner - Rep Stage
 Jason Patrick Bowcutt - Never the Sinner - Signature Theatre
 Patrick Stewart - Othello - The Shakespeare Theatre
 Peter Goldfarb - Old Wicked Songs - The Studio Theatre
 Richard Thompson - Look Back in Anger - The Studio Theatre
 Ted van Griethuysen - The Tempest - The Shakespeare Theatre
 1999 Ted van Griethuysen - The Steward of Christendom - The Studio Theatre
 Bill Largess - Man and Superman - The Washington Stage Guild
 Jeremy Davidson - Nijinsky's Last Dance - Signature Theatre
 Max Robinson - Gross Indecency: The Three Trials of Oscar Wilde - The Studio Theatre
 Thomas W. Jones II - Waiting for Godot - The Studio Theatre
 Wallace Acton - Peer Gynt - The Shakespeare Theatre
 2000 Rick Foucheux - Edmond - Source Theatre Company
 Edward Gero - Nixon's Nixon - Round House Theatre
 Faran Tahir - Indian Ink - The Studio Theatre
 Hal Holbrook - The Merchant of Venice - The Shakespeare Theatre
 L. Peter Callender - Oak and Ivy - Arena Stage
 Rick Hammerly - Angels in America, Part I: Millennium Approaches - Signature Theatre
 2001 Philip Goodwin - Timon of Athens - The Shakespeare Theatre
 Bruce Nelson - The Mystery of Irma Vep (a penny dreadful) - Rep Stage
 Christopher Lane - Therese Raquin - Olney Theatre Center for the Arts
 Floyd King - Vigil - The Studio Theatre
 James Brown-Orleans - "Master Harold"...and the Boys - The Studio Theatre
 John Emmert - Strange Interlude - Washington Shakespeare Company
 Rick Foucheux - Hughie - The Washington Stage Guild and Source Theatre Company
 2002 Nigel Reed - The Judas Kiss - Rep Stage Company
 Bruce Alan Rauscher - The Andersonville Trial - American Century Theatre
 Conrad Feininger - A Skull in Connemara - Washington Stage Guild
 Jack Willis - Of Mice and Men - Arena Stage
 Ted van Griethuysen - The Invention of Love - Studio Theatre
 Tom Story - The Invention of Love - Studio Theatre
 Wallace Acton - Hamlet - Shakespeare Theatre
 2003 Jon Cohn - The Taste of Fire - Charter Theatre
 Christopher Lane - The Swan - Rep Stage
 Doug Brown - Hambone - The Studio Theatre
 Gerry Bamman - Shakespeare, Moses, and Joe Papp - Round House Theatre
 Rick Foucheux - Oleanna - Source Theatre
 Ted Koch - True West - Arena Stage

Outstanding Actor in a Resident Musical
 1986 Romain Fruge - Baby - Olney Theatre
 J. Fred Shiffman - March of the Falsettos - The Studio Theatre
 James W. Sudik - Little Me - Ford's Theatre
 Stephen Wade - Banjo Dancing - Arena Stage
 1992 Pedro Porro - Sweeney Todd - Signature Theatre
 Casey Biggs - A Wonderful Life - Arena Stage
 Jesse Foreman - Damn Yankees - Harlequin Dinner Theatre
 Michael L. Forrest - Sweeney Todd - Signature Theatre
 Richard Bauer - A Wonderful Life - Arena Stage
 1994 Steve Cramer - The Pirates of Penzance - Interact Theatre Company
 Floyd King - Show Me Where the Good Times Are - Olney Theatre
 Floyd King - The Pirates of Penzance - Interact Theatre Company
 Michael L. Forrest - The Pirates of Penzance - Interact Theatre Company
 Reggie Kelly - Five Guys Named Moe - Ford's Theatre

Outstanding Lead Actor in a Resident Musical
 1989 Charles Janasz - The Cocoanuts - Arena Stage
 Casey Biggs - Elmer Gantry - Ford's Theatre
 Martin Vidnovic - Side by Side by Sondheim - Olney Theatre
 Mitchell Greenberg - The Cocoanuts - Arena Stage
 Robert C. Torri - La Cage aux Folles - Harlequin Dinner Theatre
 Stephen Mellor - The Cocoanuts - Arena Stage
 1990 Evan Pappas - Lucky Stiff - Olney Theatre
 Edward Gero - The Beggar's Opera - The Shakespeare Theatre
 John Scherer - On the Town - Arena Stage
 Paul Binotto - On the Town - Arena Stage
 Stephen Wade - On the Way Home - Arena Stage
 1991 David Garrison - Merrily We Roll Along - Arena Stage
 Scott Morgan - Children With Stones - Source Theatre Company
 Grover Gardner - The Rocky Horror Show - Woolly Mammoth Theatre Company
 Johnny Holliday - Me and My Girl - Harlequin Dinner Theatre
 Stephen Schmidt - The Rocky Horror Show - Woolly Mammoth Theatre Company
 Victor Garber - Merrily We Roll Along - Arena Stage
 1993 J. Fred Shiffman - Falsettoland - The Studio Theatre
 Gary Beach - Of Thee I Sing - Arena Stage
 Michael L. Forrest - Tintypes - Round House Theatre
 Patrick Cassidy - Conrack - Ford's Theatre
 Steve Cramer - Closer Than Ever - The Rose Organization
 Steve Cramer - H.M.S. Pinafore - Interact Theatre Company
 1995 Ross Lehman - Hot Mikado - Ford's Theatre
 Brion Dinges - Capote at Yaddo (A Very Gay Little Musical) - The Studio Theatre Secondstage
 Michael L. Forrest - Iolanthe - Interact Theatre Company
 Pedro Porro - Iolanthe - Interact Theatre Company
 Pedro Porro - The Sweet Revenge of Louisa May - Olney Theatre Center for the Arts
 1996 Steven Cupo - Cabaret - Signature Theatre
 Jeff Hairston - Standup Shakespeare - Folger Shakespeare Library
 John Dossett - Elmer Gantry - Ford's Theatre
 Scott Morgan - Noel and Gertie - MetroStage
 Steve Cramer - H.M.S. Pinafore - Interact Theatre Company
 1997 Lewis Cleale - Passion - Signature Theatre
  D'Monroe - Torn From the Headlines - Everyday Theatre
  D'Monroe - Torn From the Headlines - The African Continuum Theatre Company
 Michael Sharp - Side by Side by Sondheim - MetroStage
 Paul Binotto - Candide - Arena Stage
 Steve Cramer - The Mikado - Interact Theatre Company
 Thomas W. Jones II - Hip 2: Birth of the Boom - The Studio Theatre
 1998 Lawrence Redmond - No Way to Treat a Lady - Signature Theatre
 Jason Gilbert - Hair, The American Tribal Love-Rock Musical - The Studio Theatre Secondstage
 Sal Viviano - Sunday in the Park With George - Arena Stage
 Sal Viviano - Sunday in the Park With George - Signature Theatre
 Stephen Schmidt - It's a Wonderful Life - Toby's Dinner Theatre
 Steven Cupo - The Harvey Milk Show - Source Theatre Company
 Tim Brierley - Sherlock Holmes and the Case of the Purloined Patience or The Scandal at the D'Oyly Carte - Interact Theatre Company
 1999 Stephen Bienskie - The Fix - Signature Theatre in association with Cameron Mackintosh
  Psalmayene 24 - The Hip Hop Nightmares of Jujube Brown - The African Continuum Theatre Company
 Floyd King - Mad About the Bard - Folger Shakespeare Library
 Peter Jay Fernandez - Thunder Knocking on the Door - Arena Stage
 Rob McQuay - Godspell - Round House Theatre
 2000 Anthony Cummings - Eleanor: An American Love Story - Ford's Theatre
 Frank Ferrante - Animal Crackers - Arena Stage
 Maurice Hines - Guys and Dolls - Arena Stage
 Norm Lewis - Sweeney Todd - Signature Theatre
 Tim Brierley - The Very Model of a Major Merry Music Hall - Interact Theatre Company
 2001 Dwayne Nitz - Sing Down the Moon: Appalachian Wonder Tales - Theater of the First Amendment
 Bobby Smith - Evita - Toby's Dinner Theatre
 Jeremy Kushnier - The Rhythm Club - Signature Theatre
 Rich Affannato - Floyd Collins - Signature Theatre
 Tim Martin Gleason - The Rhythm Club - Signature Theatre
 Will Gartshore - Floyd Collins - Signature Theatre
 2002 Brian Childers - Danny & Sylvia: A Musical Love Story - American Century Theatre
 Bárbaro Marín - Raices Cubanas 2 (Cuban Roots 2) - GALA Hispanic Theatre
 Jason Gilbert - Putting It Together - Signature Theatre
 Michael Rupert - A New Brain - Studio Theatre
 Will Gartshore - Grand Hotel - Signature Theatre
 2003 Rick Hammerly - Hedwig and the Angry Inch - Signature Theatre
 Brian Stokes Mitchell - Sweeney Todd - The Kennedy Center
 John Barrowman - Company - The Kennedy Center
 Patrick O'Neill - Bat Boy: The Musical - The Studio Theatre Secondstage
 Raúl Esparza - Sunday in the Park With George - The Kennedy Center
 Russell Sunday - Jekyll & Hyde The Musical - Toby's Dinner Theatre

Outstanding Lead Actress in a Resident Production
 1985 Halo Wines - Cloud 9 - Arena Stage
 Karen Trott - The Beautiful Lady - New Playwrights' Theatre
 Marcia Gay Harden - Crimes of the Heart - Olney Theatre
 Mary Ellen Nester - Top Girls - Horizons Theatre
 Mikel Lambert - Much Ado About Nothing - The Shakespeare Theatre
 Sarah Marshall - My Sister in This House - The Studio Theatre
 1986 Randy Danson - The Good Person of Szechwan - Arena Stage
 Carole Myers - Miss Lulu Bett - Horizons Theatre
 Halo Wines - 'night, Mother - Arena Stage
 Janet Bryant - Fool for Love - Round House Theatre
 Katherine Squire - A Walk Out of Water - The Studio Theatre
 Marcia Gay Harden - The Miss Firecracker Contest - Olney Theatre
 Mercedes McCambridge - 'night, Mother - Arena Stage
 1987 Tana Hicken - Old Times - Arena Stage
 Annette Helde - Landscape of the Body - The Studio Theatre
 June Hansen - The Birthday Party - The Studio Theatre
 Kathy Yarman - Sally and Marsha - Round House Theatre
 Mary Ellen Nester - Dorothy - New Arts Theatre
 Nancy Robinette - Christmas on Mars - Woolly Mammoth Theatre Company
 Tana Hicken - The Wild Duck - Arena Stage
 1988 Grainne Cassidy - Savage in Limbo - Woolly Mammoth Theatre Company
 Candy Buckley - All the King's Men - Arena Stage
 Elizabeth DuVall - To Clothe the Naked - Woolly Mammoth Theatre Company
 Jennifer Mendenhall - Savage in Limbo - Woolly Mammoth Theatre Company
 Nancy Robinette - Harvey - Woolly Mammoth Theatre Company
 Tana Hicken - Heartbreak House - Arena Stage
 1989 Jennifer Mendenhall - Aunt Dan and Lemon - Woolly Mammoth Theatre Company
 Brigid Cleary - The House of Blue Leaves - Olney Theatre
 Franchelle Stewart Dorn - Macbeth - The Shakespeare Theatre
 Grainne Cassidy - Sharon and Billy - Woolly Mammoth Theatre Company
 Kelly McGillis - The Merchant of Venice - The Shakespeare Theatre
 Shirley Knight - The Cherry Orchard - Arena Stage
 1990 Kelly McGillis - Twelfth Night - The Shakespeare Theatre
 Carolyn Swift - Talking Things Over With Chekhov - American Showcase Theatre
 Lily Knight - A Lie of the Mind - Arena Stage
 Marissa Copeland - Briar Patch - Arena Stage
 Sarah Marshall - The Dead Monkey - Woolly Mammoth Theatre Company
 1991 Pat Carroll - The Merry Wives of Windsor - The Shakespeare Theatre
 Dale Stein - A Fresh of Breath Air - Smallbeer Theatre Company
 June Hansen - Happy Days - The Washington Stage Guild
 Kim Hamilton - Fences - Arena Stage
 Nancy Paris - Frankie and Johnny in the Clair de Lune - The Studio Theatre
 Tana Hicken - Juno and the Paycock - Arena Stage
 1992 Nancy Robinette - Fat Men in Skirts - Woolly Mammoth Theatre Company
 Carolyn Swift - Love and Anger - Round House Theatre
 Crystal Laws Green - Jar the Floor - Arena Stage
 June Hansen - When I Was a Girl I Used to Scream and Shout - The Studio Theatre
 Robin Morse - My Children! My Africa! - Arena Stage
 Sarah Marshall - When I Was a Girl I Used to Scream and Shout - The Studio Theatre

Outstanding Lead Actress in a Resident Play
 1993 Franchelle Stewart Dorn - The Visit - Arena Stage
 Cathy Simpson - Boesman and Lena - American Showcase Theatre
 Halo Wines - Mrs. Klein - Arena Stage
 Jewell Robinson - A Song at Twilight - The Washington Stage Guild
 Naomi Jacobson - Kvetch - Woolly Mammoth Theatre Company
 Sarah Marshall - Elektra - Round House Theatre
 1994 Pat Carroll - Mother Courage and Her Children - The Shakespeare Theatre
 Amy Waddell - Spunk - The Studio Theatre
 Catherine Flye - Shirley Valentine - Interact Theatre Company
 Kerry Waters - Free Will and Wanton Lust - Woolly Mammoth Theatre Company
 Sarah Marshall - Criminals in Love - Round House Theatre
 1995 Ellen Karas - The Revengers' Comedies - Arena Stage
 Jane Beard - Dream of a Common Language - Theater of the First Amendment
 Lee Mikeska Gardner - Patient A - Freedom Stage
 Nancy Robinette - Who's Afraid of Virginia Woolf? - Round House Theatre
 Naomi Jacobson - Goodnight Desdemona (Good Morning Juliet) - Woolly Mammoth Theatre Company
 Nobu McCarthy - The Wash - The Studio Theatre
 Ruby Dee - Flyin' West - The Kennedy Center
 1996 Tana Hicken - Long Day's Journey Into Night - Arena Stage
 Afi McClendon - Holiday Heart - Arena Stage
 Helen Carey - Macbeth - The Shakespeare Theatre
 Nancy Robinette - Escape from Happiness - Round House Theatre
 Naomi Jacobson - Scenes from an Execution - Potomac Theatre Project
 Sarah Marshall - Escape from Happiness - Round House Theatre
 1997 Nancy Robinette - Better Living - Round House Theatre
 Helen Carey - Henry VI - The Shakespeare Theatre
 Jane Beard - One Shoe Off - Round House Theatre
 Michelle Shupe - Cymbeline - Washington Shakespeare Company
 Nancy Robinette - The Obituary Bowl - Woolly Mammoth Theatre Company
 Pamela Nyberg - Blithe Spirit - Arena Stage
 Phylicia Rashad - Blues for an Alabama Sky - Arena Stage
 1998 Holly Twyford - Romeo and Juliet - Folger Shakespeare Library
 Cam Magee - An Ideal Husband - The Washington Stage Guild
 Jenny Bacon - Molly Sweeney - Arena Stage
 Kelly McGillis - Mourning Becomes Electra - The Shakespeare Theatre
 Sarah Marshall - Sylvia - The Studio Theatre
 Tana Hicken - Ghosts - Arena Stage
 1999 S. Epatha Merkerson - The Old Settler - The Studio Theatre
 Elizabeth Ashley - Sweet Bird of Youth - The Shakespeare Theatre
 Halo Wines - Holiday Memories - Olney Theatre Center for the Arts
 Holly Twyford - Much Ado About Nothing - Folger Shakespeare Library
 Judith Hawking - Lovers and Executioners - Arena Stage
 Tana Hicken - The Lion in Winter - Round House Theatre and Everyman Theatre
 2000 Isabel Keating - Indian Ink - The Studio Theatre
 Deirdre Lovejoy - How I Learned to Drive - Arena Stage
 Holly Twyford - The Desk Set - The Studio Theatre
 Jane Beard - The Turn of the Screw - Round House Theatre
 Nancy Robinette - The Beauty Queen of Leenane - The Studio Theatre
 Petronia Paley - The Trojan Women - The Shakespeare Theatre
 Sarah Marshall - The Dead Monkey - Woolly Mammoth Theatre Company
 2001 Lee Mikeska Gardner - A House in The Country - Charter Theatre
 Halo Wines - Collected Stories - Theater J
 Holly Twyford - Chesapeake - Source Theatre Company
 Kate Norris - Strange Interlude - Washington Shakespeare Company
 Tana Hicken - The Glass Menagerie - Round House Theatre and Everyman Theatre
 Valerie Leonard - Therese Raquin - Olney Theatre Center for the Arts
 2002 Jenifer Deal - The Muckle Man - Source Theatre Company
 Judith Light - Hedda Gabler - Shakespeare Theatre
 Kate Eastwood Norris - Intimate Exchanges - Source Theatre Company
 Kelly McAndrew - Holiday - Olney Theatre Center for the Arts
 Lucy Newman-Williams - Macbeth - Folger Theatre
 2003 Holly Twyford - The Shape of Things - The Studio Theatre
 Holly Twyford - Oleanna - Source Theatre
 Kamilah Forbes - Chain - The African Continuum Theatre Company
 Kelly McGillis - The Duchess of Malfi - The Shakespeare Theatre
 Lee Mikeska Gardner - The Taste of Fire - Charter Theatre
 Nance Williamson - The Misanthrope - Arena Stage
 Tana Hicken - The Belle of Amherst - Rep Stage

Outstanding Actress in a Resident Musical
 1986 Janet Aldrich - Forbidden Broadway - Marquee Lounge/Omni Shoreham
 Ann Johnson - March of the Falsettos - The Studio Theatre
 Carol Dilley - Little Me - Ford's Theatre
 Liz Larsen - Baby - Olney Theatre
 1992 Donna Migliaccio - Sweeney Todd - Signature Theatre
 Brigid Brady - A Wonderful Life - Arena Stage
 Gabrielle Dunmyer - Damn Yankees - Harlequin Dinner Theatre
 Susan Bender - Sweeney Todd - Signature Theatre
 1994 Lorraine Serabian - Show Me Where the Good Times Are - Olney Theatre
 Donna Migliaccio - The Pirates of Penzance - Interact Theatre Company
 Megan Lawrence - Company - Signature Theatre
 Robin Baxter - Show Me Where the Good Times Are - Olney Theatre
 Susan Bender - The Pirates of Penzance - Interact Theatre Company

Outstanding Lead Actress in a Resident Musical
 1989 Kim Criswell - Side by Side by Sondheim - Olney Theatre
 Deidra L. Johnson - Sanctuary D.C. - No-Neck Monsters Theatre Company
 Jane Pesci-Townsend - Revenge of Mrs. Foggybottom - Marquee Lounge/Omni Shoreham
 Karen Akers - Side Side Sondheim - Olney Theatre
 Sharon Scruggs - Elmer Gantry - Ford's Theatre
 1990 Adriane Lenox - On the Town - Arena Stage
 Debra Tidwell - Lady Day at Emerson's Bar & Grill - The Studio Theatre
 Franchelle Stewart Dorn - The Beggar's Opera - The Shakespeare Theatre
 Lorraine Serabian - Lucky Stiff - Olney Theatre
 Queen Esther Marrow - Don't Let This Dream Go (A Musical Celebration of Mahalia Jackson) - Ford's Theatre
 Tia Speros - Lucky Stiff - Olney Theatre
 1991 Nanna Ingvarsson - The Rocky Horror Show - Woolly Mammoth Theatre Company
 Becky Ann Baker - Merrily We Roll Along - Arena Stage
 Liz Donohoe Weber - Me and My Girl - Harlequin Dinner Theatre
 Robin Baxter - The Rocky Horror Show - Woolly Mammoth Theatre Company
 Suzanna Guzman - Amahl and the Night Visitors - The Kennedy Center
 1993 Rebecca Rice - In Living Colors - Theater of the First Amendment
 Catherine Flye - "Joyce" The Music and Magic of Joyce Grenfell - Interact Theatre Company
 Catherine Flye - "Joyce" The Music and Magic of Joyce Grenfell - The Washington Stage Guild
 Holly Twyford - Her Aching Heart - Consenting Adults Theatre Company
 Jane Pesci-Townsend - Closer Than Ever - The Rose Organization
 Pam Bierly-Stewart - Closer Than Ever - The Rose Organization
 1995 Dana Krueger - Wings - Signature Theatre
 April Harr - Into the Woods - Signature Theatre
 Barbara McCullogh - The Sweet Revenge of Louisa May - Olney Theatre Center for the Arts
 Donna Migliaccio - Into the Woods - Signature Theatre
 Karen Culliver - The Sweet Revenge of Louisa May - Olney Theatre Center for the Arts
 1996 Dahd Sfeir - Mano a Mano - GALA Hispanic Theatre
 Bernardine Mitchell - Bessie's Blues - The Studio Theatre
 Megan Lawrence - Cabaret - Signature Theatre
 Sarah Marshall - Wanted - Woolly Mammoth Theatre Company
 Sharon Scruggs - Elmer Gantry - Ford's Theatre
 1997 Anne Kanengeiser - Passion - Signature Theatre
 Anita Hollander - The Fifth Season - Olney Theatre Center for the Arts
 Eileen Ward - The Mikado - Interact Theatre Company
 Patricia Pearce Gentry - The Rink - Signature Theatre
 Rebecca Baxter - Candide - Arena Stage
 Sherri L. Edelen - The Rink - Signature Theatre
 1998 Liz Larsen - Sunday in the Park With George - Arena Stage
 Liz Larsen - Sunday in the Park With George - Signature Theatre
 Carole Lehan - It's a Wonderful Life - Toby's Dinner Theatre
 Cathy Mundy - Joseph and the Amazing Technicolor Dreamcoat - Toby's Dinner Theatre
 Stephanie Waters - The Wizard of Oz - Toby's Dinner Theatre
 Tracie Nicole Thoms - Hair, The American Tribal Love-Rock Musical - The Studio Theatre Secondstage
 1999 Marva Hicks - Thunder Knocking on the Door - Arena Stage
 Janine Gulisano - West Side Story - Toby's Dinner Theatre
 Linda Balgord - The Fix - Signature Theatre in association with Cameron Mackintosh
 Maureen Kerrigan - Lady in the Dark - The American Century Theater
 Patricia Pearce Gentry - A Little Night Music - Signature Theatre
 2000 Anne Kanengeiser - Eleanor: An American Love Story - Ford's Theatre
 Alexandra Foucard - Guys and Dolls - Arena Stage
 Chandra Currelley - Slam! - The Studio Theatre
 Donna Migliaccio - Sweeney Todd - Signature Theatre
 Sherie Scott - Over & Over - Signature Theatre
 2001 Sherri L. Edelen - Side Show - Signature Theatre
 Alexandra Foucard - Play On! - Arena Stage
 Amy Goldberger - Side Show - Signature Theatre
 E. Faye Butler - Dinah Was - Arena Stage
 Janine Gulisano - Brigadoon - West End Dinner Theatre
 Lauren Kennedy - The Rhythm Club - Signature Theatre
 2002 Bernardine Mitchell - Blues in the Night - Arena Stage
 Deidra LaWan Starnes - SPUNK - African Continuum Theatre Company
 Donna Migliaccio - Gypsy - Signature Theatre
 Jane Pesci-Townsend - Putting it Together - Signature Theatre
 Janine Gulisano - Danny & Sylvia: A Musical Love Story - American Century Theatre
 Peggy Yates - She Loves Me - Olney Theatre Center for the Arts
 2003 Christine Baranski - Sweeney Todd - The Kennedy Center
 E. Faye Butler - The Gospel According to Fishman - Signature Theatre
 Harriett D. Foy - Polk County - Arena Stage
 Janine Gulisano - Jekyll & Hyde The Musical - Toby's Dinner Theatre
 Kate Baldwin - South Pacific - Arena Stage
 Melissa Errico - Sunday in the Park With George - The Kennedy Center

Outstanding Performer in a Resident Musical
 1987 Frank Kopyc - Hot Mikado - Ford's Theatre
 Andrea Frierson - Beehive - Arena Stage
 Helena-Joyce Wright - Hot Mikado - Ford's Theatre
 Kirsti Carnahan - Little Shop of Horrors - Olney Theatre
 Magda Nova - Beehive - Arena Stage
 1988 Sandra Bowie - A ... My Name is Alice - Horizons Theatre
 Barbara Rappaport - A ... My Name is Alice - Horizons Theatre
 Karlah Hamilton - 42nd Street - Harlequin Dinner Theatre
 Kathleen Goldpaugh - A ... My Name is Alice - Horizons Theatre
 Serge Seiden - A Dance Against Darkness: Living With AIDS - D.C. Cabaret

Supporting Acting

Outstanding Supporting Actor in a Resident Production
 1985 Floyd King - King Lear - The Shakespeare Theatre
 John Leonard - The Tempest - Arena Stage
 Mark Hammer - Cloud 9 - Arena Stage
 Richard Bauer - Man and Superman - Arena Stage
 Scott Harlan - Do Black Patent Leather Shoes Really Reflect Up? - Olney Theatre
 Steven Dawn - Lydie Breeze - New Playwrights' Theatre
 1986 Patrick Richwood - The Foreigner - Olney Theatre
 Brian Hemmingsen - Last Days at the Dixie Girl Cafe - Horizons Theatre
 Edward Gero - Othello - The Shakespeare Theatre
 Edward Gero - The Merry Wives of Windsor - The Shakespeare Theatre
 Floyd King - The Merry Wives of Windsor - The Shakespeare Theatre
 1987 Stanley Anderson - The Piggy Bank - Arena Stage
 Christopher Hurt - Automatic Pilot - Horizons Theatre
 Floyd King - The Miser - The Shakespeare Theatre
 Henry Strozier - The Philadelphia Story - Arena Stage
 Mark Hammer - The Wild Duck - Arena Stage
 Michael Chaban - Torch Song Trilogy - Castle Arts Center
 1988 Floyd King - All's Well That Ends Well - The Shakespeare Theatre
 Alan Wade - No End of Blame - Potomac Theatre Project
 Bill Whitaker - Translations - The Washington Stage Guild
 Kyle Prue - National Defense - Woolly Mammoth Theatre Company
 Stanley Anderson - The Crucible - Arena Stage
 Steven LeBlanc - Filthy Rich - Round House Theatre
 1989 Edward Gero - Macbeth - The Shakespeare Theatre
 Christopher Hurt - On the Verge or The Geography of Yearning - Round House Theatre
 Ernie Meier - Baby With the Bathwater - Round House Theatre
 John Michael Higgins - The Butterfingers Angel, Mary and Joseph, Herod the Nut and the Slaughter of 12 Hit Carols in a Pear Tree - Olney Theatre
 L. Peter Callender - Playboy of the West Indies - Arena Stage
 Philip Goodwin - The Merchant of Venice - The Shakespeare Theatre
 1990 Philip Goodwin - Twelfth Night - The Shakespeare Theatre
 David Marks - A Lie of the Mind - Arena Stage
 Grover Gardner - The Dead Monkey - Woolly Mammoth Theatre Company
 Louis A. Lotorto - The Tempest - The Shakespeare Theatre
 Ted van Griethuysen - As You Like It - The Shakespeare Theatre
 Timmy Ray James - Heathen Valley - Round House Theatre
 1991 Jarlath Conroy - Juno and the Paycock - Arena Stage
 David Marks - You Can't Take It With You - Olney Theatre
 Leland Orser - The Secret Rapture - Olney Theatre
 Lewis J. Stadlen - The Caucasian Chalk Circle - Arena Stage
 Ted van Griethuysen - Mary Stuart - The Shakespeare Theatre
 Willy Corpus - Made in Bangkok - The Studio Theatre
 1992 Ted van Griethuysen - Saint Joan - The Shakespeare Theatre
 Hugh Nees - The Illusion - Round House Theatre
 Jack Ryland - King Lear - The Shakespeare Theatre
 Jon Tindle - Mrs. Warren's Profession - The Washington Stage Guild
 Michael Willis - Mud People - Woolly Mammoth Theatre Company
 Wally Taylor - Before It Hits Home - Arena Stage

Outstanding Supporting Actor in a Resident Play
 1993 Floyd King - The Lisbon Traviata - The Studio Theatre
 Nick Olcott - Faith Healer - Scena Theatre
 Rob Leo Roy - Kvetch - Woolly Mammoth Theatre Company
 Teagle F. Bougere - Trinidad Sisters - Arena Stage
 Ted van Griethuysen - Hamlet - The Shakespeare Theatre
 1994 Edward Gero - Richard II - The Shakespeare Theatre
 Bob Amaral - The Brothers Karamazov - Arena Stage
 Jason Kravits - Free Will and Wanton Lust - Woolly Mammoth Theatre Company
 John Neville-Andrews - Shadowlands - Olney Theatre
 Kryztov Lindquist - La B te - Source Theatre Company
 Philip Goodwin - Julius Caesar - The Shakespeare Theatre
 1995 Edward Gero - Henry IV - The Shakespeare Theatre
 David Sabin - Henry IV - The Shakespeare Theatre
 Jason Kravits - All in the Timing - Round House Theatre
 Rainn Wilson - The Revengers' Comedies - Arena Stage
 T J Edwards - Misalliance - Arena Stage
 1996 Henry Strozier - A Month in the Country - Arena Stage
 Casey Biggs - Long Day's Journey Into Night - Arena Stage
 Floyd King - Love's Labor's Lost - The Shakespeare Theatre
 J. Fred Shiffman - Rhinoceros - The Studio Theatre
 Jarlath Conroy - Henry V - The Shakespeare Theatre
 Rainn Wilson - Long Day's Journey Into Night - Arena Stage
 1997 Wallace Acton - Henry VI - The Shakespeare Theatre
 Donald Griffin - Two Trains Running - The Studio Theatre
 J. Fred Shiffman - The Miser - Arena Stage
 Philip Goodwin - Volpone - The Shakespeare Theatre
 Ted van Griethuysen - Volpone - The Shakespeare Theatre
 Wallace Acton - Volpone - The Shakespeare Theatre
 1998 Robert Sella - Mourning Becomes Electra - The Shakespeare Theatre
 Christopher Henley - Bent - Washington Shakespeare Company
 Christopher Lane - Romeo & Juliet - Olney Theatre Center for the Arts
 J. Fred Shiffman - Sylvia - The Studio Theatre
 James Brown-Orleans - A Saroyan Celebration - The American Century Theater
 Marty Lodge - The Rehearsal - Round House Theatre
 1999 J. Fred Shiffman - Lovers and Executioners - Arena Stage
 Bruce Nelson - The Triumph of Love - Washington Shakespeare Company
 Donald Griffin - Seven Guitars - The Studio Theatre
 Everett Quinton - The Merry Wives of Windsor - The Shakespeare Theatre
 Frederick Strother - Seven Guitars - The Studio Theatre
 Marty Lodge - Criminal Genius - Round House Theatre
 Nick Olcott - Dead Funny - Woolly Mammoth Theatre Company
 2000 Christopher Lane - Equus - Olney Theatre Center for the Arts
 Christopher Henley - Entertaining Mr. Sloane - Washington Shakespeare Company
 Craig Wallace - Angels in America, Part II: Perestroika - Signature Theatre
 Doug Brown - The Last Orbit of Billy Mars - Woolly Mammoth Theatre Company
 Floyd King - A Midsummer Night's Dream - The Shakespeare Theatre
 Marty Lodge - The Beauty Queen of Leenane - The Studio Theatre
 Paul Morella - Angels in America, Part I: Millennium Approaches - Signature Theatre
 2001 Ted van Griethuysen - Timon of Athens - The Shakespeare Theatre
 Brian McMonagle - Too True To Be Good - The Washington Stage Guild
 Carlos Castillo - El burlador de Sevilla y convivado de piedra (Don Juan of Seville) - GALA Teatro Hispano
 Christopher Marlowe Roche - The Importance of Being Earnest - Source Theatre Company
 David Jourdan - Twelve Angry Men - The Keegan Theatre
 Edward Gero - bash: latterday plays - The Studio Theatre
 Rick Foucheux - Heaven - Woolly Mammoth Theatre Company
 2002 Helmar Augusttus Cooper - Jitney - Studio Theatre
 Bruce Nelson - Fuddy Meers - Woolly Mammoth Theatre Company
 David Marks - The Rivals - Olney Theatre Center for the Arts
 Doug Brown - Fuddy Meers - Woolly Mammoth Theatre Company
 Michael Glenn - Major Barbara - Washington Stage Guild
 Roger Kraus - The Judas Kiss - Rep Stage Company
 2003 Michael Ray Escamilla - Recent Tragic Events - Woolly Mammoth Theatre Company
 Andrew Long - The Duchess of Malfi - The Shakespeare Theatre
 Bruce Nelson - Faith Healer - Rep Stage
 David Sabin - The Little Foxes - The Shakespeare Theatre
 Donald Carrier - The Duchess of Malfi - The Shakespeare Theatre
 Robert Hogan - A Moon for the Misbegotten - Arena Stage

Outstanding Supporting Actor in a Resident Musical
 1993 Richard Bauer - Of Thee I Sing - Arena Stage
 Buzz Mauro - Assassins - Signature Theatre
 Michael L. Forrest - Cabaret - Washington Jewish Theatre
 Romain Fruge - Falsettoland - The Studio Theatre
 Sean Baldwin - Assassins - Signature Theatre
 1995 Christopher A. Flint - Into the Woods - Signature Theatre
 Anthony Bryan - God's Trombones - DC ART/WORKS
 Lawrence Hamilton - Hot Mikado - Ford's Theatre
 Steve Cramer - Iolanthe - Interact Theatre Company
 Wallace Acton - Wings - Signature Theatre
 1996 David A. St. Louis - Bessie's Blues - The Studio Theatre
 David James - Pirates of Penzance - Burn Brae Dinner Theatre
 J. Fred Shiffman - Wanted - Woolly Mammoth Theatre Company
 Lawrence Redmond - Cabaret - Signature Theatre
 LeRoi Simmons - Black Nativity - The Kennedy Center
 2002 Michael Sharp - Grand Hotel - Signature Theatre
 Andrew Wynn - The Pirates of Penzance - Interact Theatre Company
 Gary Marshall Dieter - Forever Plaid - Toby's Dinner Theatre
 Paul Takacs - Perseus Bayou - Theatre of the First Amendment
 Steven Tipton - The Pirates of Penzance - Interact Theatre Company
 2003 Ted L. Levy - Hot Mikado - Ford's Theatre
 Brad Anderson - South Pacific - Arena Stage
 Clinton Derricks-Carroll - Polk County - Arena Stage
 J. Fred Shiffman - Privates on Parade - The Studio Theatre
 Lawrence Redmond - South Pacific - Arena Stage
 Mark Price - Sweeney Todd - The Kennedy Center

Outstanding Supporting Actress in a Resident Production
 1985 Tami Tappan - Lydie Breeze - New Playwrights' Theatre
 Barbara Klein - Top Girls - Horizons Theatre
 Brigid Cleary - Enter a Free Man - Olney Theatre
 Elizabeth DuVall - The Wake of Jamey Foster - The Studio Theatre
 Peggy Cosgrave - Crimes of the Heart - Olney Theatre
 1986 Erika Bogren - A Walk Out of Water - The Studio Theatre
 Brigid Cleary - The Miss Firecracker Contest - Olney Theatre
 Isabell Monk - Tartuffe - Arena Stage
 Katherine Leaske - Tartuffe - Arena Stage
 Ramona Rhoades - The Knight From Olmedo - GALA Hispanic Theatre
 Tana Hicken - Execution of Justice - Arena Stage
 1987 Pat Carroll - Romeo and Juliet - The Shakespeare Theatre
 Barbara Rappaport - Johnny Bull - Horizons Theatre
 Heather Ehlers - The Philadelphia Story - Arena Stage
 Joan Kelley - Beyond Therapy - Source Theatre Company
 Mikel Lambert - The Miser - The Shakespeare Theatre
 Sybil Lines - The Cherry Orchard - The Shakespeare Theatre
 1988 Franchelle Stewart Dorn - The Winter's Tale - The Shakespeare Theatre
 Francine Beers - Light Up the Sky - Arena Stage
 Mary Ellen Nester - Savage in Limbo - Woolly Mammoth Theatre Company
 Muriel Smallwood - The Entertainer - The Studio Theatre
 Nancy Paris - North Shore Fish - The Studio Theatre
 1989 Sarah Marshall - Baby With the Bathwater - Round House Theatre
 June Hansen - An Ideal Husband - The Washington Stage Guild
 Kathryn Kelley - The Glass Menagerie - New Playwrights' Theatre
 Lilia Skala - Les Blancs - Arena Stage
 Michaeleen O'Neil - Safe Sex - Source Theatre Company
 Patricia Connolly - Ring Round the Moon - Arena Stage
 1990 Kaia Calhoun - Heathen Valley - Round House Theatre
 Jennifer Mendenhall - The Common Pursuit - The Studio Theatre
 June Hansen - Blithe Spirit - The Washington Stage Guild
 Lynnie Raybuck - Happy Birthdays - Smallbeer Theatre Company
 Sarah Marshall - Briar Patch - Arena Stage
 Tana Hicken - The Man Who Came to Dinner - Arena Stage
 1991 Robin Baxter - West Memphis Mojo - The Studio Theatre
 Beverly Cosham - Rebel Armies Deep Into Chad - Round House Theatre
 Franchelle Stewart Dorn - Mary Stuart - The Shakespeare Theatre
 Grainne Cassidy - Zero Positive - Woolly Mammoth Theatre Company
 Halo Wines - You Can't Take It With You - Olney Theatre
 Oni Faida Lampley - Rebel Armies Deep Into Chad - Round House Theatre
 1992 Marilyn Coleman - Jar the Floor - Arena Stage
 Cathy Simpson - spell #7: geechee jibara quick magic trance for technologically stressed third world people - The Studio Theatre
 Desiree Marie - Fat Men in Skirts - Woolly Mammoth Theatre Company
 Jennifer Mendenhall - When I Was a Girl I Used to Scream and Shout - The Studio Theatre
 Jessica May - Psycho Beach Party - Source Theatre Company
 Sandra Reaves-Phillips - Before It Hits Home - Arena Stage

Outstanding Supporting Actress in a Resident Play
 1993 Francesca Buller - Hamlet - The Shakespeare Theatre
 Carol Monda - Morticians in Love - Consenting Adults Theatre Company
 Carolyn Pasquantonio - The Miracle Worker - Olney Theatre
 Gillian Holt - Table Settings - Theater J
 June Hansen - Joe Egg - Round House Theatre
 Roz Fox - Shakin' the Mess Outta Misery - Source Theatre Company
 1994 Mary Vreeland - Mother Courage and Her Children - The Shakespeare Theatre
 Kate Buddeke - Dancing at Lughnasa - Arena Stage
 Mary Tucker - Red Scare on Sunset - Source Theatre Company
 Naomi Jacobson - Free Will and Wanton Lust - Woolly Mammoth Theatre Company
 Tana Hicken - It's the Truth (If You Think It Is) - Arena Stage
 Tana Hicken - Summer and Smoke - Arena Stage
 1995 Naomi Jacobson - Dream of a Common Language - Theater of the First Amendment
 Jennifer Mendenhall - Goodnight Desdemona (Good Morning Juliet) - Woolly Mammoth Theatre Company
 June Hansen - The Revengers' Comedies - Arena Stage
 Mary Tucker - Jeffrey - Source Theatre Company
 Roz Fox - Wedding Band - Round House Theatre
 Tana Hicken - The Revengers' Comedies - Arena Stage
 1996 June Kyoko Lu - The Waiting Room - Arena Stage  
Paula Gruskiewicz - It's Only a Play - MetroStage
Marcia Gardner - Poor Super Man - Signature Theatre
Mary Teresa Fortuna - The Pitchfork Disney - Woolly Mammoth Theatre Company
Isabel Dada - Dona Rosita la Soltera o el Lenguaje de las Flores - GALA Hispanic Theatre  
 1997 Helen Carey - Volpone - The Shakespeare Theatre
 Deidrie N. Henry - Blues for an Alabama Sky - Arena Stage
 Lisa Newman-Williams - A Cheever Evening - Source Theatre Company
 Mary Teresa Fortuna - Quills - Woolly Mammoth Theatre Company
 Megan Morgan - Four Dogs and a Bone - Signature Theatre
 Tana Hicken - Arcadia - Arena Stage
 1998 Franchelle Stewart Dorn - Mourning Becomes Electra - The Shakespeare Theatre
 Franchelle Stewart Dorn - Othello - The Shakespeare Theatre
 Laurena Mullins - Anna Karenina - The Washington Stage Guild
 Lisa Newman-Williams - Psychopathia Sexualis - Source Theatre Company
 Rana Kay - 5 July - Washington Shakespeare Company
 Rhea Seehorn - The Big Slam - Woolly Mammoth Theatre Company
 1999 Rena Cherry Brown - A Delicate Balance - The American Century Theater
 Gretchen Cleevely - Dimly Perceived Threats to the System - Arena Stage
 Holly Twyford - The Steward of Christendom - The Studio Theatre
 Lynda Grav_tt - The Old Settler - The Studio Theatre
 Nancy Robinette - Freedomland - Woolly Mammoth Theatre Company
 Sarah Ripard - Dangerous Liaisons - Rep Stage
 Sarah Ripard - Dangerous Liaisons - Source Theatre Company
 2000 June Hansen - Indian Ink - The Studio Theatre
 Jewell Robinson - Inns & Outs - Source Theatre Company
 Lee Mikeska Gardner - Stanley - Potomac Theatre Project
 Naomi Jacobson - Mere Mortals - Round House Theatre
 Rachel Gardner - In Good Company: The Power Edition - Horizons Theatre
 Sarah Marshall - How I Learned to Drive - Arena Stage
 2001 Jewell Robinson - Blue - Arena Stage
 Jenifer Deal - Dancing at Lughnasa - The Keegan Theatre
 Kerri Rambow - A House in The Country - Charter Theatre
 Kerri Rambow - The Most Fabulous Story Ever Told - Source Theatre Company
 Nancy Robinette - Wonder of the World - Woolly Mammoth Theatre Company
 Sarah Marshall - Betty's Summer Vacation - The Studio Theatre
 2002 Mia Whang - Far East - Studio Theatre
 Catherine Flye - Rapture - MetroStage
 Crystal Fox - Home - Round House Theatre
 Lynn Chavis - Home - Round House Theatre
 Sarah Fox - Love & Yearning in the Not-for-Profits and Other Marital Distractions - Theatre J
 Tina Fabrique - Constant Star - Arena Stage
 2003 Nancy Robinette - The Little Foxes - The Shakespeare Theatre
 Catherine Flye - She Stoops to Conquer - Folger Theatre
 Dori Legg - Recent Tragic Events - Woolly Mammoth Theatre Company
 Menchu Esteban - La Verdad Sospechosa - Gala Hispanic Theatre
 Susan Lynskey - The Laramie Project - Olney Theatre Center for the Arts
 Tana Hicken - The Winter's Tale - The Shakespeare Theatre

Outstanding Supporting Actress in a Resident Musical
 1993 Ella Mitchell - Conrack - Ford's Theatre
 Ann Johnson - Falsettoland - The Studio Theatre
 Donna Migliaccio - Assassins - Signature Theatre
 La Shayla Logan - Conrack - Ford's Theatre
 Sherri L. Edelen - Assassins - Signature Theatre
 1995 Megan Lawrence - Into the Woods - Signature Theatre
 Beth Clark - Iolanthe - Interact Theatre Company
 Loretta Devine - Hot Mikado - Ford's Theatre
 Robin Baxter - Hot Mikado - Ford's Theatre
 Suzanne Genz - Wings - Signature Theatre
 1996 Roz White - Bessie's Blues - The Studio Theatre
 Eileen Ward - Hello, Dolly! - Toby's Dinner Theatre
 Karlah Hamilton - First Lady Suite - Signature Theatre
 Monique Lorraine Midgette - Beehive - Toby's Dinner Theatre
 Patricia Pearce Gentry - Cabaret - Signature Theatre
 2002 Kadejah Oni Higdon - SPUNK - African Continuum Theatre Company
 Andrea Frierson-Toney - A New Brain - Studio Theatre
 Deanna Harris - Gypsy - Signature Theatre
 Jane Pesci-Townsend - The Pirates of Penzance - Interact Theatre Company
 Sherri L. Edelen - She Loves Me - Olney Theatre Center for the Arts
 2003 Lori Tan Chinn - South Pacific - Arena Stage
 Alice Ripley - Company - The Kennedy Center
 Lauri Kraft - Bat Boy: The Musical - The Studio Theatre Secondstage
 Mariani Ebert - Brasil: as coisas do samba - Gala Hispanic Theatre
 Perri Gaffney - Polk County - Arena Stage
 Ta'rea Campbell - The Gospel According to Fishman - Signature Theatre

Outstanding Supporting Performer in a Resident Musical
 1998 David James - The Wizard of Oz - Toby's Dinner Theatre
 Albert Coia - Down at the Old Bull & Bush - Interact Theatre Company
 Donna Migliaccio - No Way to Treat a Lady - Signature Theatre
 Kate Kiley - Sherlock Holmes and the Case of the Purloined Patience or The Scandal at the D'Oyly Carte - Interact Theatre Company
 Kit Halliday - The Harvey Milk Show - Source Theatre Company
 Lawrence Redmond - Working - Signature Theatre
 1999 Sal Mistretta - The Fix - Signature Theatre in association with Cameron Mackintosh
 Donna Migliaccio - A Little Night Music - Signature Theatre
 Doug Eskew - Thunder Knocking on the Door - Arena Stage
 Jason Gilbert - Lady in the Dark - The American Century Theater
 Rhea Seehorn - Marat/Sade - Washington Shakespeare Company
 Robb McKindles - A Little Night Music - Signature Theatre
 2000 Christopher Michael Bauer - Slam! - The Studio Theatre
 Carla Della Torre - West Side Story - West End Dinner Theatre
 John J. Kaczynski - Sweeney Todd - Signature Theatre
 Peggy Yates - Dreams from a Summer House - Rep Stage
 Steve Routman - Eleanor: An American Love Story - Ford's Theatre
 Wayne W. Pretlow - Guys and Dolls - Arena Stage
 2001 Eric Jordan Young - Side Show - Signature Theatre
 Carla J. Hargrove - Dinah Was - Arena Stage
 Harriett D. Foy - Reunion, A Musical Epic in Miniature - Ford's Theatre
 J.J. Kaczynski - You're A Good Man, Charlie Brown - Round House Theatre
 Mark Jaster - The Fantasticks - Round House Theatre
 Nikki Crawford - Play On! - Arena Stage

See also
Helen Hayes Awards Non-Resident Acting
Helen Hayes Awards Non-Resident Production
Helen Hayes Awards Resident Design
Helen Hayes Awards Resident Production

Sources
 

Culture of Washington, D.C.
Helen Hayes Awards